Ugada limbata is a species of cicadas belonging to the family Cicadidae.

Distribution
This species is present in West Africa (Ivory Coast, Nigeria, Gabon, Burkina Faso, Central African Republic, Cameroon, Congo, Democratic Republic of Congo, Zambia).

References

External links
 Asahi-net

Platypleurini
Hemiptera of Africa
Insects described in 1775
Taxa named by Johan Christian Fabricius